The Italian cave salamander (Speleomantes italicus) is a species of salamander in the family Plethodontidae. Endemic to Italy, its natural habitats are temperate forests, rocky areas, caves, and subterranean habitats (other than caves). It is threatened by habitat loss.

Description
The Italian cave salamander is a slender species with short limbs and grows to a length of about  including a short tail. The head is broad with prominent eyes and there is a distinct groove between the nostrils and the edge of the lips. The feet are partially webbed. It is dark in colour with mottled reddish or yellowish markings and a dark belly. In the north of its range it is more variable in colour and sometimes hybridises with Ambrosi's cave salamander (Speleomantes ambrosii).

Distribution and habitat
The Italian cave salamander is native to northern Italy where it is found in the northern and central Apennine Mountains. Its range extends from the Province of Lucca and Province of Reggio Emilia southwards to the Province of Pescara.

An introduced population of this salamander exists in an abandoned quarry in a beech forest near Holzminden, Germany. It is hypothesized that the salamanders have been there for as long as a century, as there was a family in the area that owned both an animal import business and several nearby quarries back in the early 20th century.

Behaviour
The Italian cave salamander is usually found in areas of limestone rock, but sometimes in sandstone or ophiolitic areas. It is agile, climbing on cave walls and rocky outcrops. The female lays a small clutch of eggs in a crevice and these hatch by direct development into miniature salamanders.

Status
The International Union for Conservation of Nature has assessed the Italian cave salamander as being endangered.

References

Speleomantes
Cave salamanders
Amphibians of Europe
Endemic fauna of Italy
Amphibians described in 1923
Taxonomy articles created by Polbot